Peter Christian may refer to:

 Peter Christian (actor) (born 1947), English actor
 Peter M. Christian (born 1947), President of the Federated States of Micronesia